Trigonopterus binodulus is a species of flightless weevil in the genus Trigonopterus from Indonesia.

Etymology
The specific name is derived from the Latin words bi- (meaning "two") and nodulus (meaning "small swelling").  The name refers to the shape of the apex of the elytra.

Description
Individuals measure 2.78–4.20 mm in length.  General coloration is black, with rust-colored tarsi and antennae.  In an example of sexual dimorphism, females carapaces are shiny, while males are dull.

Range

Phylogeny
T. binodulus is part of the T. dimorphus species group.

References

binodulus
Beetles described in 2014
Beetles of Asia